Pishiklu (also Romanized as Pīshīklū; also known as Peshneklū) is a village in Ujan-e Gharbi Rural District, in the Central District of Bostanabad County, East Azerbaijan Province, Iran. At the 2006 census, its population was 353, in 57 families.

References 

Populated places in Bostanabad County